The Bavarian State Ballet is a professional ballet company in Munich, Germany. It was founded in 1988 by Konstanze Vernon as an independent company. The ballet had previously been part of the Bayerische Staatsoper. In a broader sense, Bavarian State Ballet is sometimes used for the Bavarian State Opera Ballet before 1988. From 2016 to 2022, Igor Zelensky was director of the ballet. In 2022, Laurent Hilaire took over the ballet. The company is formed by international dancers and has a repertory of more than 80 works from Romantic ballet to the 21st century. It is considered as a leading company in Europe.

References

External links 
  

Ballet companies in Germany
1988 establishments in West Germany
Organisations based in Munich
Performing groups established in 1988